Janardhan is one of the names of Hindu Lord Krishna.

Janardhan may also refer to:
 Bank Janardhan (born 1948), Indian actor
 Boda Janardhan (born 1958), Indian politician
 Janardhan Reddy (disambiguation), several people
 Janardhan Sharma (born 1963), Nepalese politician
 P. Janardhan Reddy (1948–2007), Indian politician
 G. Janardhana Reddy (born 1967–) Indian politician and Industrialist (Former Minister of Tourism Department and Infrastructure Development of Karnataka from 30 May 2008 to 3 August 2011)

See also 
 Janardan, a given name